Telegraph Peak may refer to:

Telegraph Peak (California)
Telegraph Peak (Lander County, Nevada)